Haffner may refer to:


People
 Enrico Haffner (1640–1702) Baroque painter of quadratura active mainly in Bologna, Italy
 Jean Georg Haffner (1777–1830), founded the spa at Sopot, Poland
 Paul Leopold Haffner (1829-1899), German Roman Catholic bishop
 Sebastian Haffner (1907–1999), German journalist and historian
 Scott Haffner (born 1966), American basketball player
 Sigmund Haffner the Elder (1699–1772), prominent businessman and mayor of Salzburg, Austria; see Symphony No. 35 (Mozart)
 Sigmund Haffner the Younger (1756–1787), his son who commissioned two celebrated pieces of music by Mozart; see Symphony No. 35 (Mozart)

Music
 Haffner Serenade, K. 250 by Mozart
 Haffner Symphony, K. 385 by Mozart (his Symphony No. 35)
 Haffner Orchestra in Lancaster, England

Places
Haffner Pass, a pass running between Gilbert Glacier and Mozart Ice Piedmont, Antarctica

Mountains 
 Haffner Bjerg, Greenland mountain

See also
 Hafner (disambiguation) 
 Heffner (disambiguation)